José Antonio Fernández may refer to:
 Josan (footballer), real name José Antonio Fernández Pomares (born 1989), Spanish footballer
 José Antonio Fernández Carbajal (born 1954), Mexican businessman
 José Antonio Fernández de Castro (1887–1951), Cuban journalist and writer
 José Antonio Fernández (tennis) (born 1965), Chilean tennis player
Fer, real name José Antonio Fernández Fernández, (1949–2020), Spanish comic artist.